Robert Chase Townsend (July 30, 1920 – January 12, 1998) was an American business executive and author who is noted for transforming Avis into a rental car giant.

Biography
Townsend was born in Washington, D.C. in 1920. His parents moved to Great Neck, New York where he spent his childhood. After high school, he was accepted to Princeton, graduating in 1942. After graduating from college, he was commissioned as an officer in the United States Navy, serving for the remainder of World War II.

After the war, he was hired by American Express in 1948. By the time he left the company, he was the senior vice president for investment and international banking. In 1962, Lazard Frères bought Avis, a struggling auto rental company that had never made a profit in its existence. One of the partners, André Meyer, convinced Townsend to leave American Express and become CEO of Avis. Under his direction as president and chairman, the firm became a credible force in the industry, fueled by the "We Try Harder" advertising campaign (1962–65). Avis also began to have profits, which Townsend credited to Theory Y governance. In 1965, ITT acquired Avis, leading to Townsend's departure as president. After leaving Avis, he became a senior partner of Congressional Monitor in 1969. The company was later renamed Washington Monitor, Leadership Directories (1995-2018), and Leadership Connect (2019-). He wrote the widely acclaimed essay on business management, Up the Organization, which spent 28 weeks on The New York Times Best Seller list upon its publication in 1970.

In 1990, Townsend had to have triple bypass surgery. During the late 1990s, he was the chairman of the executive committee of Leadership Directories. On January 12, 1998, he was vacationing in Anguilla. While telling a fishing story on a ketch, he had a massive heart attack leading to his death.  Townsend was married to Joan Tours. He had three daughters, executive and attorney Claire Townsend (1952–1995), the actress Jill (b. 1945) and Joan, as well as two sons, Jeffrey and Robert Jr.

Bibliography

References

External links
Paging Robert Townsend

Portrait of Robert Townsend, 1970. Los Angeles Times Photographic Archive (Collection 1429). UCLA Library Special Collections, Charles E. Young Research Library, University of California, Los Angeles.

1920 births
1998 deaths
American chief executives
20th-century American writers
20th-century American male writers
United States Navy personnel of World War II